Naessens is a Dutch patronymic surname, "Naes" or "Naas" being short for "Donaas", a Dutch form of Donatian.

People
Gaston Naessens (born 1924), developer of 714-X claimed treatment
Jens Naessens (born 1991), Belgian footballer
Marie-Thérèse Naessens (born 1939), Belgian racing cyclist
Willy Naessens (born 1939), Belgian industrialist

References

Dutch-language surnames
Patronymic surnames
Surnames of Belgian origin